The England cricket team toured Australia during the 1982–83 season, playing a five-Test series for The Ashes and a number of tour matches against Australian domestic teams before competing in a One-Day International (ODI) series against New Zealand for the Rothmans Cup. In between those competitions, England also participated in the Benson & Hedges World Series Cricket triangular ODI series against Australia and New Zealand.

Background
The 1982/83 series, sponsored by Benson & Hedges and celebrating the centenary of the Ashes, was the first to be held in Australia following the rapprochement between the Australian Cricket Board (ACB) and Kerry Packer's World Series Cricket franchise. There had been a test series organized between Australia and England during the 1979–80 season, but this was part of a "triangular" test series that also involved the West Indies, and so the Ashes were not being contested.

It had also been 18 months since the memorable 1981 Ashes series, which England had won 3–1 thanks to the heroics of several players, chief among them Ian Botham. In the lead-up to the 1982/83 series, the Nine Network, which had won exclusive rights to broadcast cricket on Australia television for ten years following World Series Cricket, ran an advertising campaign drawing on national stereotypes and aimed to inspire patriotism and an appetite for revenge.

England squad
The England selectors announced their squad on 11 September which flew out to Australia on 13 October. Doug Insole was appointed Tour Manager, with Norman Gifford as his assistant, while Warwickshire physiotherapist Bernard Thomas joined the squad for his eleventh successive tour. Veteran pace bowler Bob Willis was appointed captain. The squad was weakened by the absence of a number of players from the previous Ashes series who had become ineligible for selection; Graham Gooch, Geoff Boycott, John Emburey, Mike Hendrick, Alan Knott, Wayne Larkins, Chris Old, Peter Willey and Bob Woolmer were serving three-year bans from international cricket due to their participation in the rebel tour to South Africa. Somewhat more controversial was the omission of available players like Mike Gatting, Trevor Jesty, Graham Dilley and Phil Edmonds; Gatting and Edmonds had played pivotal roles in Middlesex' county championship success, Gatting scoring over 1600 runs at an average of nearly 59, as well as contributing 21 wickets, and Edmonds taking 80 wickets. With three off-spinners selected in the squad (Hemmings, Marks and Miller), his left-arm orthodox spin would have provided much-needed variety. To bolster their pace stocks, the selectors sprang a surprise by including 21-year-old Jamaican-born Norman Cowans.

 Ian Botham (Somerset)
 Geoff Cook (Northamptonshire)
 Norman Cowans (Middlesex)
 Graeme Fowler (Lancashire)
 Ian Gould (Sussex)
 David Gower (Leicestershire)
 Eddie Hemmings (Nottinghamshire) 
 Robin Jackman (Surrey)
 Allan Lamb (Northamptonshire)
 Vic Marks (Somerset)
 Geoff Miller (Derbyshire)
 Derek Pringle (Essex)
 Derek Randall (Nottinghamshire)
 Chris Tavaré (Kent)
 Bob Taylor (Derbyshire)
 Bob Willis (Warwickshire)

Tour matches

First-class: Queensland v England XI

Other: Northern New South Wales v England XI

First-class: South Australia v England XI

First-class: Western Australia v England XI

The Ashes series

First Test

Day one
In hot and dry conditions (Perth was in the middle of a heatwave), Greg Chappell won the toss and elected to field, meaning that in all five Ashes tests played at the WACA to date, the toss-winning captain had sent the opposition in to bat first. The Australians made an early breakthrough when Dennis Lillee dismissed Geoff Cook for 1 with a short ball the Northamptonshire opener fended off his ribs to John Dyson at forward short leg with England's score on 14. Vice-captain David Gower was next in and ensured with Chris Tavaré that no further wickets were lost, going into lunch with the score on 66.

In the middle session, Gower began to find his rhythm while Tavaré, who survived two dropped catches, continued to frustrate the Australians with dour defence. Lillee, whose cantankerous nature had in recent years become more difficult to control, had already been involved in a number of concerning incidents. After a leg-before appeal against Gower was rejected, he beat a fist into the ground, then following the next delivery which Gower played back up the pitch, Lillee kicked the ball angrily towards the slips. The second-wicket partnership had yielded 95 runs when Gower, shortly after hitting his ninth four, was caught superbly off Terry Alderman by Dyson at backward square leg; Gower's innings of 72 in only 143 minutes was considered the highlight of the day's play. Allan Lamb struggled early and was lucky to survive after nearly playing a delivery from Bruce Yardley onto his leg stump. When tea was called, England were 140 for two from 57 overs.

There was tension and controversy in the final session, beginning when Lillee was again denied a wicket, appealing for a caught behind against Lamb. After some angry looks and muttering, Lillee snatched his sun hat from umpire Tony Crafter at the end of the over; this same umpire had come between Lillee and Pakistani batsman Javed Miandad in an incident during the previous year's Perth test. Tavaré again let his partner take the initiative to push the score along, with Lamb now striking some hefty blows. The pair added 80 for the third wicket before Lamb, having just hit Yardley for a straight six against the sightscreen, edged a ball in the same over onto his thigh and wicketkeeper Rod Marsh was able to dive forward and take the rebound. Lamb had scored 46 in 109 minutes which included five fours in addition to the aforementioned six. Ian Botham, Australia's nemesis from the previous series, strode to the crease and attacked from the outset, scoring 12 off six balls when, in the last ball of a Geoff Lawson over, Botham played forward and appeared beaten by an in-swinger. As wicketkeeper Marsh came forward to take a low catch, Lawson appealed to umpire Crafter for a catch but was rejected. After Lawson had collected his sun hat at the end of the over, he appealed to square leg umpire Mel Johnson, who confirmed to his colleague that the ball had carried. Crafter reversed his decision and gave Botham out. Botham, to his credit, walked immediately even though he had indicated to the umpires that the ball had struck his pad rather than the edge of the bat, and television replays suggested this was the case. it was now Derek Randall's turn to join Tavaré in the middle for the final hour of play, and struggled to settle, playing and missing outside his off stump. Lillee took the second new ball with 15 minutes remaining, but was unable to break through. At stumps England were 242 for four, with Tavaré on 66 and Randall on 32. Remarkably, Tavaré had not added to his score in the last 71 minutes of the day's play.

Day two
The second day's play was marred by spiteful clashes between Australian and English fans, which spilled onto the field and claimed Terry Alderman as an unfortunate victim.

Second Test

Third Test

Fourth Test

Fifth Test

One Day Internationals in New Zealand

New Zealand won the Rothmans Cup 3–0.

1st ODI

2nd ODI

3rd ODI

Statistics

First-class batting and fielding

First-class bowling

Annual reviews
 Playfair Cricket Annual 1983
 Wisden Cricketers' Almanack 1983

Further reading
 Chris Harte, A History of Australian Cricket, Andre Deutsch, 1993

References

External links
 CricketArchive – tour itinerary

1982 in Australian cricket
1982 in English cricket
1982 in New Zealand cricket
1982–83 Australian cricket season
1983 in Australian cricket
1983 in English cricket
1983 in New Zealand cricket
1982-83
International cricket competitions from 1980–81 to 1985
1982-83